This is a list of dynamical system and differential equation topics, by Wikipedia page. See also list of partial differential equation topics, list of equations.

Dynamical systems, in general

Deterministic system (mathematics)
Linear system
Partial differential equation
Dynamical systems and chaos theory
Chaos theory
Chaos argument
Butterfly effect
0-1 test for chaos
Bifurcation diagram
Feigenbaum constant
Sharkovskii's theorem
Attractor
Strange nonchaotic attractor
Stability theory
Mechanical equilibrium
Astable
Monostable
Bistability
Metastability
Feedback
Negative feedback
Positive feedback
Homeostasis
Damping ratio
Dissipative system
Spontaneous symmetry breaking
Turbulence
Perturbation theory
Control theory
Non-linear control
Adaptive control
Hierarchical control
Intelligent control
Optimal control
Dynamic programming
Robust control
Stochastic control
System dynamics, system analysis
Takens' theorem
Exponential dichotomy
Liénard's theorem
Krylov–Bogolyubov theorem
Krylov-Bogoliubov averaging method

Abstract dynamical systems

Measure-preserving dynamical system
Ergodic theory
Mixing (mathematics)
Almost periodic function
Symbolic dynamics
Time scale calculus
Arithmetic dynamics
Sequential dynamical system
Graph dynamical system
Topological dynamical system

Dynamical systems, examples
List of chaotic maps
Logistic map
Lorenz attractor
Lorenz-96
Iterated function system
Tetration
Ackermann function
Horseshoe map
Hénon map
Arnold's cat map
Population dynamics

Complex dynamics

Fatou set
Julia set
Mandelbrot set

Difference equations

Recurrence relation
Matrix difference equation
Rational difference equation

Ordinary differential equations: general

Examples of differential equations
Autonomous system (mathematics)
Picard–Lindelöf theorem
Peano existence theorem
Carathéodory existence theorem
Numerical ordinary differential equations
Bendixson–Dulac theorem
Gradient conjecture
Recurrence plot
Limit cycle
Initial value problem
Clairaut's equation
Singular solution
Poincaré–Bendixson theorem
Riccati equations
Functional differential equation

Linear differential equations

Exponential growth
Malthusian catastrophe
Exponential response formula
Simple harmonic motion
Phasor (physics)
RLC circuit
Resonance
Impedance
Reactance
Musical tuning
Orbital resonance
Tidal resonance
Oscillator
Harmonic oscillator
Electronic oscillator
Floquet theory
Fundamental frequency
Oscillation (Vibration)
Fundamental matrix (linear differential equation)
Laplace transform applied to differential equations
Sturm–Liouville theory
Wronskian
Loewy decomposition

Mechanics

Pendulum
Inverted pendulum
Double pendulum
Foucault pendulum
Spherical pendulum
Kinematics
Equation of motion
Dynamics (mechanics)
Classical mechanics
Isolated physical system
Lagrangian mechanics
Hamiltonian mechanics
Routhian mechanics
Hamilton-Jacobi theory
Appell's equation of motion
Udwadia–Kalaba equation
Celestial mechanics
Orbit
Lagrange point
Kolmogorov-Arnold-Moser theorem
N-body problem, many-body problem
Ballistics

Functions defined via an ODE

Airy function
Bessel function
Legendre polynomials
Hypergeometric function

Rotating systems

Angular velocity
Angular momentum
Angular acceleration
Angular displacement
Rotational invariance
Rotational inertia
Torque
Rotational energy
Centripetal force
Centrifugal force
Centrifugal governor
Coriolis force
Axis of rotation
Flywheel
Flywheel energy storage
Momentum wheel
Spinning top
Gyroscope
Gyrocompass
Precession
Nutation

Swarms
 Particle swarm optimization
 Self-propelled particles
 Swarm intelligence

Stochastic dynamic equations

Random walk
Autoregressive process
Unit root
Moving average process
Autoregressive–moving-average model
Autoregressive integrated moving average
Vector autoregressive model
Stochastic differential equation
Stochastic partial differential equation

Mathematics-related lists
Outlines of mathematics and logic
Lists of topics